Guebwiller (Alsatian: Gàwiller) is a commune in the Haut-Rhin département in Grand Est currently in north-eastern France. It was a sub-prefecture of the department until 2015.

In 2018, Guebwiller had a population of 11,022 and its urban area had a population of 28,662.

History
Guebweiler, as Gebweiler, is mentioned as early as 774. It belonged to the religious foundation of Murbach, and in 1759 the abbots chose it for their residence. In 1789, at the outbreak of the French Revolution, the monastic buildings were laid in ruins, and, though the archives were rescued and removed to Colmar, the library perished.

Geography

Climate
Guebwiller has a oceanic climate (Köppen climate classification Cfb).

Population

People 
Guebwiller was the birthplace of

 Casimir de Rathsamhausen (1698-1786)
 Ignace Ritter (1732-1813), architect
 François Joseph Rudler (1757-1837)
 Émile Keller (1820-1909) 
 Niklaus Riggenbach (1817-1899), engineer
 Frédéric Ritter (1819-1893)
 Théodore Deck (1823-1891), ceramist
 Joseph Guerber (1824-1909), writer and journalist
 Gustave Schlumberger (1844-1929), historian, Byzantinist, numismatist
 Andreas Bauer (1866-1900) missionary Franciscan friar, martyr in China
 Jeanne Bucher (1872-1946)
 Prosper Merklen (1874-1939), physician
 Jean Schlumberger (1877-1968), publisher and writer
 Francois Conrad Schlumberger (1878-1936), co-founder of Schlumberger. see Schlumberger Brothers
 Charles Hueber (1883-1943), politician
 Emile Henry Marcel Schlumberger (1884-1953), co-founder of Schlumberger. see Schlumberger Brothers
 Louis Gava (1891-1965), conductor
 Al Weill (1893-1969), boxing manager
 Joseph Storck (1897-1989)
 Alfred Kastler (1902-1984), physicist
 Émile Baas (1906-1984), essayist
 Pierre Lévy (1907-2002), industrialist
 Armand Walter (1908-1995)
 Robert Schilling (historian) (1913–2004), 
 Pierre Ritz (1922-2009), conductor and composer
 Katia Krafft (1942-1991), volcanologist
 Roland Hodel (1943-), prefect and politician
 Sonia Pelletier-Gautier (1958-), historian and writer

Twin towns

Guebwiller is twinned with:
 Lucerne (Switzerland)
 Castelfiorentino (Italy)

Points of interest

Romanesque and early gothic church, Église Saint-Léger
Gothic former Dominican abbey Les Dominicains, now used as a cultural center.
Early Renaissance townhall (Hôtel de ville)
Neoclassical church Église Notre-Dame, the largest Neoclassical church in Alsace
Musée Théodore Deck et des pays du Florival, the largest museum in Haut-Rhin outside Colmar and Mulhouse
Parc de la Marseillaise
Synagogue of Guebwiller

See also
 Communes of the Haut-Rhin département

References

External links

Official website 
Homepage of the Musée du Florival
Wikipedia page for Église Notre Dame 
The Florivaliens homepage

Communes of Haut-Rhin
Haut-Rhin communes articles needing translation from French Wikipedia